Burma participated in the 1954 Asian Games held in the capital city of Manila, Philippines. This country was ranked 8th with 2 gold medals, and 2 bronze medals with a total of 4 medals to secure its spot in the medal tally.

Medalists

Medal summary

Medal table

References

Nations at the 1954 Asian Games
Myanmar at the Asian Games
1954 in Burma